Grand Tunis or Greater Tunis (Arabic: تونس الكبرى, French: Grand Tunis) is the largest metropolitan area in Tunisia, centered on the country's capital Tunis. It consists of four governorates: Tunis, Ariana, Manouba and Ben Arous. According to the 2004 population census, the area of Grand Tunis is home to 2,247,800 people.

See also
North East Tunisia

References

Metropolitan areas
Geography of Tunisia